The 2016 Big South Conference softball tournament were held at Winthrop University's Terry Field from May 11 through May 14, 2016. Longwood won their second straight tournament championship, and the third of their four years in the conference, earning the conference's automatic bid to the 2016 NCAA Division I softball tournament. The first and second rounds were streamed online through the Big South Network, while the semifinals and championship were streamed on ESPN3.

Seeds
The nine conference teams which sponsor college softball all received bids. The bottom two seeds have a play-in game to determine who will advance to face the top seeded team. Teams will be seeded by record within the conference, with a tiebreaker system to seed teams with identical conference records.

Tournament

8/9 Elimination game

Double-elimination tournament

All times listed are Eastern Daylight Time.

References

Big South Tournament
Big South Conference softball tournament